Larwill may refer to:

Larwill, Indiana, a town in Whitley County, Indiana, United States
David Larwill (1956–2011), Australian artist 
Edwin Larwill (ca 1806–1876), politician in the Province of Canada

See also
Larwill Park, a former park and sporting field in what is now Vancouver, British Columbia, Canada
 Lerwill (disambiguation)